<onlyinclude>

Aston Villa Football Club is an English professional association football club based in Aston, Birmingham, who currently play in the Premier League. The club was founded in 1874 and have played at its current home ground, Villa Park, since 1897. Aston Villa was one of the founding members of The Football League in 1888 and the Premier League in 1992. Aston Villa is one of the most successful clubs in English football history, having won 25 honours in its history.

This is a list of Aston Villa's notable players, generally this means players that have played 100 or more competitive matches for the club, a feat often referred to as joining the 100 club. However, some players who have played fewer matches are also included; players from the club's pre-Football League days, when they played fewer matches in a season than the present day, club captains, record-holders, and players that became coaches or managers at the club are also included. Players who hold records have footnotes describing the record. Players are listed according to the date of their first-team debut for the club. Appearances are for first-team competitive matches only including those as a substitute; wartime matches are excluded as competitions were regarded as invitational or friendly.

Notable players

Statistics correct as of 28 November 2022.

(n/a) = Information not available
Players in bold are still playing for the club.

References
Footnotes

Specific

General

External links
 
 
List of Aston Villa international players

Aston Villa F.C. players

Players
Association football player non-biographical articles